Andy Starr (born "Franklin Delano Gulledge"; October 21, 1932 – September 12, 2003) was a rockabilly musician once described by Billboard as "one of the more noteworthy Presley disciples." However poor song selection and other difficulties made him never chart. "Andy Starr" recorded on Holiday Inn Records as Frank Starr. He spent time performing in Alaska as Frank Starr, did gospel music, and also ran as a long-shot candidate in the 1996 United States presidential election.

Web source 

 Foster, D. Wayne. retrieved from 2008 audio interview recording; https://web.archive.org/web/20100715152543/http://www.holidayinnrecords.com/.

External links

[ All Music]
Wildoatsrecords

American rockabilly musicians
1932 births
2003 deaths
20th-century American musicians
Country musicians from Arkansas